The Kashimbila Hydroelectric Power Station, also Kashimbilla Hydroelectric Power Station is a 40 MW hydroelectric power station across the Katsina River in Nigeria. Originally intended to be an 18 megawatt  installation, the dam and power station were re-configured to a 40 MW power station and the dam reservoir expanded from 200Mm3 to 500Mm3. The energy generated here is distributed within Taraba State, helping to meet an estimated 80 percent of households and businesses, as of 2020.

Design
The hydroelectric plant was intended to resolve ecological issues and increase local power supply. Zutari Engineering of South Arica was hired to carry out "a technical feasibility study" of the dam's spillway in 2011. Later, Zutari was hired to perform the "detailed design of the dam, a technical feasibility study of the hydropower station, and, eventually the detailed design of the hydropower station". Commercial commissioning was effected in December 2019.

Location
The power station lies across the Katsina River, near the town of Kashimbila, Kambove Territory,  Wukari Federation, Taraba State, in south-eastern Nigeria, close to the international border with Cameroon. The geographical coordinates of Kashimbila Hydroelectric Power Station are: 06°52'27.0"N, 9°45'43.0"E (Latitude:6.874167; Longitude:9.761944).

Overview
The Kashimbila Dam was conceived during the 2011 to 2015 time frame. Its objective is multipurpose. The first goal is to mitigate flooding which used to affect an estimated six million people in Taraba State, Benue State, Cross River State, Kogi State and Delta State. The second goal is to provide drinking water to neighboring communities, with an estimated population of 400,000 people. The third goal is to provide clean electricity for use, primarily in Taraba State. The fourth objective is to provide water for irrigation to an estimated .

The energy generated at this power station is evacuated via a number of 33kV and 132kV high voltage transmission lines to locations where the electricity is integrated into the Nigerian electricity grid. The evacuation power lines and associated substations were built new, as part of this development project.

See also

 List of power stations in Nigeria
 Mambilla Hydroelectric Power Station

References

External links
 Kashimbila Dam

Taraba State
Energy infrastructure completed in 2019
Hydroelectricity in Nigeria
Dams in Nigeria
Hydroelectric power stations in Nigeria
2019 establishments in Nigeria
21st-century architecture in Nigeria